Tenetiše (in older sources also Tenetišče) is a settlement on the right bank of the Sava River east of Litija in central Slovenia. The area is part of the traditional region of Lower Carniola and is now included with the rest of the Municipality of Litija in the Central Sava Statistical Region.

Name
The name Tenetiše (a feminine plural noun) is derived from the earlier plural demonym *Tenetiščane, meaning 'residents of Tenetišče' (a neuter singular noun). This, in turn, is derived from the common noun *teneto or *tenetъ 'hunting net', and may refer to a hunting area where small game or birds were caught using nets. Tenetiše was formerly a hamlet of Breg pri Litiji known as Gornja vas (literally, 'upper village'). Tenetiše was known as Tenetitsch in German.

Notable people
Notable people that were born or lived in Tenetiše include:
Jože Štok (a.k.a. Korotan) (born 1924), Partisan soldier and career officer

References

External links

Tenetiše on Geopedia

Populated places in the Municipality of Litija